8th Street station is a station on the Blue Line of the San Diego Trolley located in National City, California. Surrounded by an industrial area, the primary focus of this station is to serve as a commuter lot, as it is easily accessible from Interstate 5.

History

This station was renovated, starting January 20, 2014 as part of the Trolley Renewal Project; it reopened with a renovated station platform in early September 2014.

Station layout
There are two tracks, each with a side platform.

See also
 List of San Diego Trolley stations

References

Blue Line (San Diego Trolley)
Railway stations in the United States opened in 1981
1981 establishments in California
San Diego Trolley stations